Anna Ościłowicz (born 4 January 1989 as Anna Narel) is a Polish female badminton player.

Achievements

BWF International Challenge/Series
Women's Singles

Women's Doubles

 BWF International Challenge tournament
 BWF International Series tournament
 BWF Future Series tournament

References

External links
 
 

1989 births
Living people
Polish female badminton players
Place of birth missing (living people)